Bhatkar is an Indian surname principally of Marathi origin, from the central Indian area of Maharashtra. The Bhatkars primarily speak the language Marathi. Notable people bearing this surname include:

Laxman Shrawan Bhatkar (1901–70), Indian social worker
Ramesh Bhatkar (1949–2019), Indian Marathi and Bollywood actor
Snehal Bhatkar (1919–2007; born Vasudev Gangaram Bhatkar), Indian film music composer
Vijay P. Bhatkar (born 1946), Indian computer scientist and educationalist

Surnames of Indian origin